Haresabad (also Romanized as Ḩāres̄ābād; also known as Moslemābād) is a village in Qasabeh-ye Gharbi Rural District, in the Central District of Sabzevar County, Razavi Khorasan Province, Iran. At the 2006 census, its population was 1,339, in 368 families.

Abu'l-Fadl Bayhaqi, a Persian secretary, historian and author was born in this village and his tomb is there too.

References 

Populated places in Sabzevar County